Sokoura may refer to:

Burkina Faso
Sokoura, Balé
Sokoura I, Mangodara Department, Comoé, the first of two identically named villages in the Mangodara Department
Sokoura II, Mangodara Department, Comoé, the second of two identically named villages in the Mangodara Department
Sokoura, Tiéfora Department, Comoé

Mali
Sokoura, Mali